Criticism of postmodernism is intellectually diverse, reflecting various critical attitudes toward postmodernity, postmodern philosophy, postmodern art, and postmodern architecture.  Postmodernism is generally defined by an attitude of skepticism, irony, or rejection toward what it describes as the grand narratives and ideologies associated with modernism, especially those associated with Enlightenment rationality though postmodernism in the arts may have their own definitions. Thus, while common targets of postmodern criticism include universalist ideas of objective reality, morality, truth, human nature, reason, science, language, and social progress, critics of postmodernism often defend such concepts. It is frequently alleged that postmodern scholars promote obscurantism, are hostile to objective truth, and encourage relativism (in culture, morality, knowledge) to an extent that is epistemically and ethically crippling. Criticism of more artistic post-modern movement such as post-modern art or literature may include objections to a departure from beauty, lack of coherence or comprehensibility, deviating from clear structure and the consistent use of dark and negative themes.

Vagueness
Postmodernism has received significant criticism for its lack of stable definition and meaning. The term marks a departure from modernism, and may refer to an epoch of human history (see Postmodernity), a set of movements, styles, and methods in art and architecture, or a broad range of scholarship, drawing influence from scholarly fields such as critical theory, post-structuralist philosophy, and deconstructionism. There is substantial dispute about which features of postmodernism, if any, are essential to the concept, and its enigmatic meaning and related "perceived lack of political commitment, subjectivist interpretations, fragmentary nature, and nihilistic tendencies" have led to substantial academic frustration and criticism. The ineffability of postmodernism has been described as "a truism" and some claim it is a "buzzword".  This "semantic instability" has been long acknowledged in scholarship.

Critics of postmodernism frequently charge that postmodern art/authorship is vague, obscurantist, or meaningless. Some philosophers, such as Jürgen Habermas, argue that postmodernism contradicts itself through self-reference, since its critique would be impossible without the concepts and methods that modern reason provides.

Linguist Noam Chomsky has argued that postmodernism is meaningless because it adds nothing to analytical or empirical knowledge. He asks why postmodernist intellectuals won't respond like people in other fields when asked:

Christopher Hitchens in his book Why Orwell Matters advocates for simple, clear, and direct expression of ideas and argues that postmodernists wear people down by boredom and semi-literate prose. Hitchens also criticized a postmodernist volume, "The Johns Hopkins Guide to Literary Theory and Criticism": "The French, as it happens, once evolved an expression for this sort of prose: la langue de bois, the wooden tongue, in which nothing useful or enlightening can be said, but in which various excuses for the arbitrary and the dishonest can be offered. (This book) is a pointer to the abysmal state of mind that prevails in so many of our universities."

In a similar vein, Richard Dawkins writes in a favorable review of Alan Sokal and Jean Bricmont's Intellectual Impostures:

Dawkins then uses the following quotation from Félix Guattari as an example of this "lack of content" and of clarity.

Of the term itself
It has been suggested that the term "postmodernism" is a mere buzzword that means nothing. For example, Dick Hebdige, in Hiding in the Light, writes:

Postmodern-friendly intellectuals, such as British historian Perry Anderson defend the existence of the varied meanings assigned to "postmodernism", arguing that they only contradict one another on the surface, and that a postmodernist analysis can offer insight into contemporary culture. Kaya Yilmaz defends the lack of clarity and consistency in the term's definition, maintaining that because postmodernism is itself "anti-essentialist and anti-foundationalist" it is fitting that the term cannot have any essential or fundamental meaning. Sokal has critiqued similar defenses of postmodernism by noting that replies like this only demonstrate the original point that postmodernist critics are making: that a clear and meaningful answer is always missing and wanting.

Moral relativism
Christian authors Josh McDowell and Bob Hostetler provide the following definition of postmodernism: "A worldview characterized by the belief that truth doesn't exist in any objective sense but is created rather than discovered. ... [Truth is] created by the specific culture and exists only in that culture.  Therefore, any system or statement that tries to communicate truth is a power play, an effort to dominate other cultures." Culturally conservative writers, such as Charles Colson, are characterized as tending to look askance at the postmodernist era as ideologically agnostic and replete with moral relativism or situation ethics. Other critics have interpreted postmodern society to be synonymous with moral relativism and contributing to deviant behavior.

Many philosophical movements reject both modernity and postmodernity as healthy states of being. Some of these are associated with cultural and religious conservatism that views postmodernity as a rejection of basic spiritual or natural truths and in its emphasis on material and physical pleasure an explicit rejection of inner balance and spirituality. Many of these critiques attack specifically the tendency to the "abandonment of objective truth" as the crucial unacceptable feature of the postmodern condition and often aim to offer a meta-narrative that provides this truth.

Marxian criticisms
Alex Callinicos attacks notable postmodern thinkers such as Baudrillard and Lyotard, arguing postmodernism "reflects the disappointed revolutionary generation of 1968, (particularly those of May 1968 in France) and the incorporation of many of its members into the professional and managerial 'new middle class'. It is best read as a symptom of political frustration and social mobility rather than as a significant intellectual or cultural phenomenon in its own right."

Art historian John Molyneux, also of the Socialist Workers' Party, attacks postmodernists for "singing an old song long intoned by bourgeois historians of various persuasions".

Fredric Jameson, American literary critic and Marxist political theorist, attacks postmodernism (or poststructuralism) for what he claims is "the cultural logic of late capitalism", for its refusal to critically engage with the metanarratives of capitalization and globalization. The refusal renders postmodernist philosophy complicit with the prevailing relations of domination and exploitation.

Art Bollocks
Art Bollocks is an article written by Brian Ashbee which appeared in the magazine Art Review in April 1999. Ashbee refers to the importance given to language in "post-modern" art. The post-modern art forms mentioned by Ashbee are: "installation art, photography, conceptual art [and] video". The term bollocks in the title relates to nonsense.

An example can be found in Private Eye issue 1482, being an imaginary interview of Tracey Emin by an unduly fawning Alan Yentob.

Sokal affair

Alan Sokal, a physics professor at New York University, formulated the Sokal affair, a hoax in which he wrote a deliberately nonsensical article in a style similar to postmodernist articles. The article was accepted for publication by the journal Social Text despite the obvious lampooning of postmodernists' view of science. Sokal liberally used vague post-modernist concepts and lingo all the while criticising empirical approaches to knowledge. On the same day of the release he published another article in a different journal explaining the Social Text article. This was turned into a book Fashionable Nonsense which offered a critique of the practices of postmodern academia. In the book he and Jean Bricmont point out the misuse of scientific terms in the works of postmodern philosophers but they state that this does not invalidate the rest of the work of those philosophers to which they suspend judgement.

Mumbo Jumbo
Francis Wheen's book How Mumbo-Jumbo Conquered the World broadly critiques a variety of non-critical paradigms with a significant critique of cultural relativism and the use of postmodern tropes to explain all modern geo-political phenomena. According to Wheen, postmodern scholars tend to critique unfair power structures in the west including issues of race, class, patriarchy, the effect of radical capitalism and political oppression. Where he finds fault in these tropes is when the theories go beyond evidence-based critical thinking and use vague terminology to support obscurantist theories. An example is Luce Irigaray's assertion, cited by Alan Sokal and Jean Bricmont in their book Fashionable Nonsense, that the equation "E=mc2" is a "sexed equation", because "it privileges the speed of light over other speeds that are vitally necessary to us". Relativism, according to Wheen becomes a sort of wall which shields non western cultures from the same sustained critiques. While inherent sexism in North America is open to hostile critique (as it should be according to Wheen), according to postmodern thought it is taboo to critique honour killings and female genital mutilation in North Africa and the Middle East. Relativism will defend such taboos by claiming such cultures are out of the sphere of shared Western values and that we cannot judge other cultures by our own standards or it is defended through diminishing the severity of sexism by either denying its prominence (as Western propaganda/misunderstanding) or blaming it on menacing Western factors (imperialism, globalization, Western hegemony, resource exploitation and Western interference in general). Wheen admits that, while some of this may have merit, its case is highly exaggerated by relativism. Wheen reserves his strongest critique for those who defend even the most appalling systemic mistreatment of women, even in countries where Western contact and influence is minimal.

See also 
 Postmodernism Generator
 Thinkers of the New Left
 Postmodernism Paradox

References

 
Postmodernism